Elections to Hinckley and Bosworth Borough Council were held on 1 May 2003.  The whole council was up for election, with boundary changes having taken place since the last election in 1999. The Conservative Party took overall control of the council.

Election Result

Ward results

References

2003
2003 English local elections
2000s in Leicestershire